Asrat Tunjo (born 29 November 1996) is an Ethiopian professional footballer who plays as a defender for Ethiopian Premier League club Ethiopian Coffee and the Ethiopia national team.

Club career 
In the summer of 2017, Tunjo signed with Ethiopian Coffee after leaving his former club Jimma Aba Jifar F.C. In 2019, Tunjo had a verbal agreement to join newly promoted side Sebeta City before contract negotiations broke off. He ultimately chose to resign with Ethiopian Coffee. Tunjo has been utilized in multiple positions during his time at Ethiopian Coffee.

References

External links

Living people
1996 births
Ethiopian footballers
Association football midfielders
Ethiopia international footballers
Jimma Aba Jifar F.C. players
Ethiopian Coffee S.C. players
2021 Africa Cup of Nations players